The 1962 U.S. Women's Open was the 17th U.S. Women's Open, held June 28–30 at The Dunes Golf and Beach Club in Myrtle Beach, South Carolina.

Murle Lindstrom, age 23, won the title for her first LPGA Tour victory, two strokes ahead of runners-up Ruth Jessen and Jo Ann Prentice. The first of her four wins on tour, it was the only major title for Lindstrom, later known as Murle Breer.

Defending champion Mickey Wright was a co-leader after 36 holes, but fell back on Saturday morning in the third round and finished five strokes back in a tie for fourth. Wright had won three of the previous four years; she won her fourth U.S. Women's Open two years later in 1964. Jessen led after each of the first three rounds, but a final round 80 (+8) dropped her back.

Thirty professionals and eleven amateurs made the 36-hole cut at 166 (+22) or better; the low amateur was JoAnne Gunderson at 313 (+25), tied for fifteenth place.

Past champions in the field

Source:

Final leaderboard
Saturday, June 30, 1962

Source:

References

External links
USGA final leaderboard
U.S. Women's Open Golf Championship
U.S. Women's Open – past champions – 1962
The Dunes Golf & Beach Club

U.S. Women's Open
Golf in South Carolina
Sports competitions in South Carolina
Myrtle Beach, South Carolina
Women's sports in South Carolina
U.S. Women's Open
U.S. Women's Open
U.S. Women's Open